Al-Shatra Sports Club is an Iraqi football club, playing in the Iraq Division Two. It is based in the town of Ash Shatra, just north of Nasiriyah in Dhi Qar Governorate.

Honours
Iraq Division One: (1)
2004–05 (shared)

1969 establishments in Iraq
Football clubs in Dhi Qar